The Australian cricket team in England in 1905 played 35 first-class matches including 5 Tests. Australia was captained by Joe Darling.  The England captain in all five Tests was Stanley Jackson.

The touring team

 Joe Darling (captain)
 Monty Noble (vice-captain)
 Warwick Armstrong 
 Tibby Cotter
 Reggie Duff 
 Algy Gehrs
 Syd Gregory 
 Clem Hill
 Bert Hopkins 
 Bill Howell 
 Jim Kelly
 Frank Laver
 Charlie McLeod
 Phil Newland
 Victor Trumper 

Laver was the player-manager, assisted by Newland.

Test series summary
England won the Test series 2–0, with three matches drawn.

First Test

The Australian second innings in this match still holds the record for the lowest innings total (188) when a bowler conceded 100 runs (BJT Bosanquet 8/107).

Second Test

Third Test

Fourth Test

Fifth Test

References

Annual reviews
 Wisden Cricketers' Almanack 1906

Further reading
 Bill Frindall, The Wisden Book of Test Cricket 1877-1978, Wisden, 1979
 Alan Gibson, Jackson's Year, Cassell, 1965
 Chris Harte, A History of Australian Cricket, Andre Deutsch, 1993
 Ray Robinson, On Top Down Under, Cassell, 1975

External links
 Australia in England, 1905 at Cricinfo
 Australia in British Isles 1905 at CricketArchive
 Australia to England 1905  at Test Cricket Tours

1905 in Australian cricket
1905 in English cricket
1905
English cricket seasons in the 20th century
International cricket competitions from 1888–89 to 1918
1905